Dileep A. Rao (born July 29, 1973) is an American actor who has appeared in feature films and television series. He starred in Sam Raimi's horror film Drag Me to Hell (2009), James Cameron's science fiction film series Avatar (2009–present), and Christopher Nolan's thriller Inception (2010).

Early life and education
Rao was born in Los Angeles, California, to a physicist mother and an engineer father, both of Indian descent. He grew up in Yanbu, Saudi Arabia; Denver, Colorado; and Claremont, California. He has one sister, who is a professor at the University of Michigan's Ross School of Business. He graduated from Claremont High School and the University of California, San Diego, with a B.A., later receiving an M.F.A. from the American Conservatory Theater in San Francisco, where his class included Anna Belknap and Elizabeth Banks.

Career
Rao's first role after graduating was in the American premiere of Indian Ink by Tom Stoppard.  Rao moved to Los Angeles and began working in regional theater including at the Berkeley Rep, South Coast Repertory, and for the Manhattan Theater Club.

He competed on Jeopardy! on June 7, 2002, and won $34,400. On June 8, 2008, Rao was randomly selected from over 1,600 entrants to play the NPR Weekend Edition Sunday puzzle on air with Will Shortz.

In 2009, he appeared in Avatar and Drag Me to Hell. He was nominated for several awards as part of the ensemble cast in Christopher Nolan's 2010 film Inception, in which he played a pharmacologist.

Filmography

Film

Television

References

External links

Interview with Dileep Rao

Living people
Male actors from Los Angeles
American male film actors
American people of Kannada descent
American male stage actors
Jeopardy! contestants
University of California, San Diego alumni
American Conservatory Theater alumni
1973 births
American male actors of Indian descent